Tylospilus is a genus of predatory stink bugs in the family Pentatomidae. There are about five described species in Tylospilus.

Species
These five species belong to the genus Tylospilus:
 Tylospilus acutissimus (Stål, 1870)
 Tylospilus armatus Thomas, 1992
 Tylospilus chilensis Spinola, 1852
 Tylospilus nigrobinotatus Berg, 1879
 Tylospilus peruvianus Horvath, 1911

References

Further reading

 
 
 

Asopinae
Pentatomidae genera
Articles created by Qbugbot